The Senior CLASS Award is presented each year to the outstanding senior NCAA Division I Student-Athlete of the Year in baseball.  The award was established in 2007.

See also
List of college baseball awards
Baseball awards#U.S. college baseball

References

External links
Lowe’s Senior CLASS Award (baseball) official webpage

College baseball trophies and awards in the United States
Senior CLASS Award Base
Awards established in 2007
2007 establishments in the United States